John Dyne (fl. 1383–1414) was an English politician.

He was a Member (MP) of the Parliament of England for East Grinstead from 1383 to 1414. Apart from this, we have no information on him; he could possibly have been a descendant of Nicholas Dyne (fl. 1352) of East Grinstead.

References

14th-century births
15th-century deaths
English MPs February 1388
English MPs February 1383
English MPs November 1414
English MPs January 1397
English MPs September 1397
English MPs 1399
English MPs 1402
English MPs 1407